Schloss Slawentzitz (Polish: Pałac Sławięcice) was a stately home in Sławięcice (part of Kędzierzyn-Koźle), in the historic Silesia (Upper Silesia) region in Poland. It served as the main residence of the princes of Hohenlohe-Öhringen, a branche of the House of Hohenlohe. It was heavily damaged in the Second World War and has subsequently been demolished. Only a portico remains.

History

Flemming and Hoym families

In the 15th century, the first castle was built in Sławięcice, owned by the dukes of Opole and later the Bohemian crown. In the 17th century, the castle was owned by various families: Bohussin von Zwolle und Güldenstein, who purchased it from emperor Rudolf II in 1600, and later the barons of Sießwohl. In 1678, Countess Henkel came into possession of the estate, who was succeeded by counts Carl Maximillian and Leo Ferdinand Henkel. Subsequently, in 1702, their heirs sold the castle to the Saxon General and minister count Heinrich Jakob von Flemming. He erected several iron smelters in Sławięcice and neighbouring towns. At these times, these were the most modern iron and steel works in Upper Silesia. In 1714, Von Flemming exchanged the estate with Adolph Magnus, baron of Hoym. Between 1716 and 1720, Hoym constructed a garden palace on the opposite of the Klodnica river, inspired by Versailles, but it soon burned down. Also, he further expanded the steel factories.

Hohenlohe-Öhringen family
In 1782, the Prussian general Frederick Louis, Prince of Hohenlohe-Ingelfingen (1746-1818) married countess Amalie von Hoym, receiving the Hoym estates in Oppurg, Thuringia, and Sławięcice. The prince fought in the Napoleonic Wars and after losing the Battle of Jena to Napoleon on 14 October 1806, he retired to Sławięcice, spending here his last years in a self-imposed exile. After his death, a monumental tomb made of cast iron with the Hohenlohe family's motto  was built in the park. His son, August, Prince of Hohenlohe-Öhringen (1784-1853) rebuilt the palace in 1827, when the old mansion burned down after being hit by a lightning strike.

In the 19th century, the Hohenlohe family became large scale industrialists in Upper Silesia and belonged to the richest citizens of Germany  Their zinc smelting works belonged to the largest in the world. They made the Sławięcice palace not only their main seat, but also the centre of their business empire. The son of August, Hugo zu Hohenlohe-Öhringen (1816-1897) received the title of Duke of Ujest at the coronation of William I as King of Prussia in 1861. The duke was an was an hereditary member of the upper houses of Württemberg and Prussia.

In 1897, prince Christian Kraft (1848-1926) succeeded his father as owner of the Sławięcice palace. During his time, the mansion received visitors like tsar Nicholas II of Russia and emperor William II. The last Hohenlohe to own the palace was prince Johann (Hans) zu Hohenlohe-Oehringen (1858–1945).

During the Second World War, the Hohenlohe family fled first to their summer palace in Oppurg  and later to Neuenstein in Hohenlohe. Since then, Schloss Neuenstein has remained the main residence of the princes up to this day. Schloss Slawentzitz with its park and greenhouses were severely damaged in the fights with the Red Army in January 1945. The ruins burnt down completely in 1948, but in the 1950s youth camps were still organized in its interiors. Unfortunately, the palace was regularly plundered and finally demolished in the 1970s. Only an entrance portico remains.

Gleiwitz incident 
The Gleiwitz incident was a false flag attack on the radio station Sender Gleiwitz in Gleiwitz (then Germany and now Gliwice, Poland) staged by Nazi Germany on the night of 31 August 1939. Along with some two dozen similar incidents, the attack was manufactured by Germany as a casus belli to justify the invasion of Poland. Despite the German government using the attack as a justification to go to war with Poland, the Gleiwitz assailants were not Polish but were German SS officers wearing Polish uniforms. The planning and preparations for this operation were carried out from the Sławięcice palace.

Architecture
The old castle was a massive square building with a single roof and was surrounded by a moat.</ref> After a lightning strike, the old castle burned down in 1827. A new three-storey mansion was built on the same site in 1830, with side wings added between 1867 and 1868. The mansion had around 45 rooms including a large ballroom.

Gardens
Prince Frederick Louis of Hohenlohe-Ingelfingen created an English landscape park around the palace. It is one of the four largest gardens in the Opole region.

Today
Nothing remains of the main building itself, except the entrance portico. The landscape park is still there containing the ruins of a mausoleum, a gardener's home, and a baroque garden pavilion built by Adolf Magnus von Hoym between 1716 and 1720.

References

Literature

External links

 

Castles in Opole Voivodeship
Former castles in Poland
House of Hohenlohe
 
Palaces in Poland
Architecture in Poland
History of Silesia
Chronology of World War II
World War II sites
Gardens in Poland